General elections were held in Peru on 8 April 1990, with a second round of the presidential elections on 10 June. The run-off was between favorite, novelist Mario Vargas Llosa leading a coalition of economically liberal parties collectively known as the Democratic Front and political underdog Alberto Fujimori of the populist and more moderate Cambio 90. Vargas Llosa won the first round with a small plurality, but alienated much of the electorate with a comprehensive privatisation agenda, bolstering the allegedly unelectable Fujimori who had finished second ahead of Luis Alva Castro of the ruling APRA party to enter the run-off against Vargas Llosa. Fujimori eventually won a landslide victory and would remain president for ten years until his resignation in November 2000.

Results

President

Chamber of Deputies

By constituency

Senate

Footnotes

Elections in Peru
Peru
1990 in Peru
Presidential elections in Peru
Election and referendum articles with incomplete results